Gordon Phillip Windeyer (born 20 February 1954) is an Australian former track and field athlete who competed in the high jump. He was the gold medallist in the event at the 1974 British Commonwealth Games, setting a games record mark.

Career
Windeyer was born in New South Wales. Using the Fosbury Flop method of high jumping, Windeyer rose to national level as a young athlete and was a repeat winner of the Australian junior title from 1971 to 1972. He jumped over two metres to win in 1972.

Both were selected to represent Australia at the 1974 British Commonwealth Games held in Christchurch.

In the 1975 season Windeyer and Peckham were again tied at the national championships, with Peckham winning on countback. That mark went unbeaten until 1984, when it was improved by John Atkinson.

Windeyer aimed to defend his high jump title at the 1978 Commonwealth Games and proved to be in good form that year after a national title win and a new personal best and Australian record-equalling clearance of  immediately before the competition. At the event in Edmonton, Alberta, Canada, Windeyer was one centimetre short of his previous games record, but this was not sufficient to reach the podium – Canadians, led by Claude Ferragne, took the top three positions and Windeyer missed out on a bronze medal on countback alone.

Windeyer subsequently retired from competitive athletics, but remained involved in the sport and later became a broad member for the regional Athletics New South Wales organisation.

National titles
Australian Athletics Championships
High jump: 1976, 1977, 1978

International competitions

References

Living people
1954 births
Sportsmen from New South Wales
Australian male high jumpers
Commonwealth Games gold medallists for Australia
Commonwealth Games medallists in athletics
Athletes (track and field) at the 1974 British Commonwealth Games
Athletes (track and field) at the 1978 Commonwealth Games
Medallists at the 1974 British Commonwealth Games